Wells State Park is a public recreation area located off Route 49 in the town of Sturbridge, Massachusetts. The state park includes frontage on Walker Pond and the  scenic metamorphic rock cliff face of Carpenter Rocks. Terrain is rugged with ledges interspersed between wetlands. Woodlands are of the oak-hickory forest and northern hardwood forest types with groves of eastern white pine. The park is managed by the Massachusetts Department of Conservation and Recreation.

Activities and amenities
The park offers  of trails for hiking, mountain biking, horseback riding, and cross-county skiing. A notable trail leads to the cliffs of Carpenter Rocks, named after John Carpenter, who built and operated a sawmill nearby. Vistas include the eastern section of Walker Pond and surrounding wooded valley. Walker Pond's  provide opportunities for boating and fishing. A 60-site campground includes a swimming beach for campground users. The park also offers restricted hunting and seasonal interpretive programs.

References

External links
Wells State Park Department of Conservation and Recreation
Wells State Park Trail Map Department of Conservation and Recreation

State parks of Massachusetts
Massachusetts natural resources
Parks in Worcester County, Massachusetts
Campgrounds in Massachusetts
Sturbridge, Massachusetts
Buildings and structures in Sturbridge, Massachusetts
Protected areas established in 1968
1968 establishments in Massachusetts